Kosta Protić (29 September 1831 – 4 June 1892) was the first Serbian General and the Chief of the Serbian General Staff.

Biography
During the Herzegovinian Uprising in 1875, Kosta Protić was sent by the Serbian government to Russia to investigate the possibilities for a war loan. Ivan Aksakov received Protić, instructed him and gave him letters of recommendation to the right persons in Saint Petersburg; moreover, since Aksakov's wife was a former lady-in-waiting with connections at the court, she introduced Protić to the empress Maria Alexandrovna and to the heir, the future Alexander III of Russia. The two were in favor of helping the Serbs of Bosnia and Herzegovina rid themselves of the Turks, more so than their government. Through their intercession public subscription for a loan was authorized by the tsar.  

Protić served as a military officer during the Serbian-Ottoman War (1876-1877) and the Russo-Turkish War (1877–78). He served as the Chief of the Serbian General Staff during the Russo-Turkish War. He later briefly served as Prime Minister of the Kingdom of Serbia during 1889.  Upon the abdication of King Milan, Protić was appointed to a Regency council with Jovan Ristić and Jovan Belimarković for the underage Alexander I, on which he served until his death.

Honors
Domestic
Order of the White Eagle
Order of the Cross of Takovo with swords, First and Second class
Order of the Cross of Takovo, Third class
Medal for Zealous Service, Gold with diamonds
Commemorative Medal for the War of 1876–1878
Commemorative Medal for the Serbian-Bulgarian War of 1885

Foreign
Order of St. Stanislaus, First class (Russia)
Order of St. Anna, Second class (Russia)
Order of the Crown of Romania, with a star (Romania)
Order of the Star of Romania (Romania)
Military Virtue Medal (Romania)
Order of the Iron Crown, Third class (Austria-Hungary)

See also
List of prime ministers of Serbia

References

External links

1831 births
1892 deaths
Serbian generals
Prime Ministers of Serbia
Regents of Serbia
19th-century Serbian people
Military personnel from Požarevac
Royal Serbian Army soldiers
Serbian–Turkish Wars (1876–1878)
Military personnel of the Russo-Turkish War (1877–1878)
Defence ministers of Serbia
Foreign ministers of Serbia
Construction ministers of Serbia